PJ Randhawa is a Canadian born investigative reporter based in the United States. Randhawa is currently the Investigative Race & Equity Reporter for KING5 News in Seattle, WA. Prior to that, Randhawa won multiple awards as an investigative reporter and fill-in anchor for NBC-affiliated network television station KSDK in St. Louis, Missouri. The city of St. Louis declared January 14, 2022 as 'PJ Randhawa Day' in honor of her many impactful investigations that advocated for St. Louisans. When Randhawa started at South Dakota's KOTA-TV in 2011, this prompted headlines in Indian media celebrating her as being the "first Sikh broadcast journalist" in American television news.
On January 3, 2022, Randhawa announced she will be joining KING5 News in Seattle, Washington as an  Investigative Reporter specializing in Race & Equity issues. Randhawa will be joining KING5's Peabody award winning Facing Race Unit.

Career and awards
Randhawa started her news career as a News Anchor and Reporter at ABC-affiliated KOTA in Rapid City, South Dakota. In 2013, she became an investigative reporter for WIS in Columbia, South Carolina. Randhawa received the 2013 World Sikh Award for her political reporting, and the 2014 School Bell Award for reporting on education issues.

Since 2018, Randhawa has been the recipient of 4 regional Emmy Awards, in the breaking news, talent-reporter, Investigative and health categories. She is also the recipient of an Investigative Reporters and Editors (IRE) fellowship, several Missouri Broadcasters Awards and a regional Edward R Murrow award for her 'Bad Apple Teacher' investigation

Personal life 
PJ Randhawa was born in Winnipeg, Canada, to Sukhdev and Kuljinder Randhawa, who moved there from India in 1975. Randhawa has a master's degree in broadcast journalism from DePaul University in Chicago.

References

Canadian television reporters and correspondents
Living people
Canadian women television journalists
Canadian people of Indian descent
Canadian expatriate journalists in the United States
News & Documentary Emmy Award winners
Year of birth missing (living people)